Seahaven Academy(formerly Tideway Comprehensive School) is a growing secondary school in Haven Way, Newhaven, East Sussex. The school's academic achievements improved considerably when the school joined the multi academy trust, United Learning Trust in 2014, and have been judged 'Good' by Ofsted. A new Headteacher is joining the school in April 2023, Shevlyn Byroo.  This is an exciting time for the school, who benefit from considerable support from parents and the local community.  The school continues to support the students, and parents, and works hard to offer the students a safe and positive learning environment.

External links
 School website

News items
 £11m rebuild of school in February 2008
 Rebuild of school in July 2007
 School to be rebuilt in June 2005
 School closed after £3m fire on 5 April 2005
 Suspicious fire in April 2005

Secondary schools in East Sussex
Newhaven, East Sussex
Academies in East Sussex
School buildings in the United Kingdom destroyed by arson
United Learning schools
Educational institutions established in 1986
1986 establishments in England